Zhou Peng ( born October 11, 1989) is a Chinese basketball player who currently plays for the Shenzhen Leopards of the Chinese Basketball Association (CBA). He was the captain of the Chinese National basketball team at the 2016 Rio Olympics.

Career statistics

CBA

References

1989 births
Living people
Asian Games gold medalists for China
Asian Games medalists in basketball
Basketball players at the 2010 Asian Games
Basketball players at the 2012 Summer Olympics
Basketball players at the 2014 Asian Games
Basketball players at the 2016 Summer Olympics
Basketball players from Liaoning
Chinese men's basketball players
Guangdong Southern Tigers players
Olympic basketball players of China
Sportspeople from Dandong
Small forwards
Medalists at the 2010 Asian Games
2010 FIBA World Championship players